Alejandro Abadie (born April 13, 1985) is an Argentine rugby union footballer who plays at flank for Rovigo in Italy. He has also represented the Argentina national rugby union team.

References

External links

1985 births
Living people
Argentine rugby union players
Argentina international rugby union players